Salehabad (also Romanized as Şāleḩābād) is a village in Karasf Rural District, in the Central District of Khodabandeh County, Zanjan Province, Iran. At the 2006 census, its population was 259, in 59 families.

References 

Populated places in Khodabandeh County